Macon County Courthouse is a historic county courthouse in Oglethorpe, Georgia, county seat of Macon County. It was built in 1894. t is located in Courthouse Square.  It is in the Romanesque architecture style. The facade is made of brick.  The main portico seems to be a later addition.  This entrance has four columns.  The clock tower has several stages and contains a bell and a clock.  The octagonal dome is topped with a finial.  Inside, double stairways lead to the courtroom, which features a Victorian bench.  The courthouse was added to the National Register of Historic Places on September 18, 1980.

See also
National Register of Historic Places listings in Macon County, Georgia

References

External links
 
Macon County Historical Marker Georgia Info

Buildings and structures in Macon County, Georgia
County courthouses in Georgia (U.S. state)
Courthouses on the National Register of Historic Places in Georgia (U.S. state)
Government buildings completed in 1894